Wolf & Cub was the first extended play released in November 2004 by Australian psychedelic rock group, Wolf & Cub, via Dot Dash Recordings. It has five tracks, including "Thousand Cuts". The group's line-up was Joel Byrne on lead vocals and guitar, Joel Carey on percussion, Adam Edwards on drums and percussion, and Thomas Mayhew on bass guitar. It was co-produced by the band with Matt Hills in April that year with Byrne writing all the tracks.

Track listing

References 

2004 debut EPs
Wolf & Cub albums
Dot Dash Recordings albums